Marie-Françoise or Marie Françoise is a given name. Notable people with the name include:

Ghislaine Marie Françoise Dommanget (1900–1991), French actress
Marie Françoise Sophie Gay (1776–1852), French author
Marie-Françoise Audollent, French actress
Marie-Françoise Guédon, Canadian anthropologist and professor of religious studies
Marie-Françoise Pérol-Dumont, the President of the General Council of the French department of Haute-Vienne

See also 

Françoise
Marie (given name)

Compound given names
French feminine given names